Moreton Hall Community Woods is an 18.5 hectare local nature reserve in Bury St Edmunds in Suffolk. it is owned by West Suffolk Council and managed by Woodland Ways.

This site in six separate nearby areas has woodland, grassland, a pond, paths and cycleways.

Access points include Kingsworth Road and Symonds Road

References

Local Nature Reserves in Suffolk